Hong Kong Exchanges and Clearing Limited (HKEX; , also 香港交易所 or 港交所 ) operates a range of equity, commodity, fixed income and currency markets through its wholly owned subsidiaries The Stock Exchange of Hong Kong Limited (SEHK), Hong Kong Futures Exchange Limited (HKFE) and London Metal Exchange (LME).

With a total market capitalisation of over US$6 trillion as of 2021, HKEX is the sixth largest stock exchange by market capitalization of listed companies. As of the end of December 2020, there were 2,538 companies listed on HKEX's securities market. HKEX has been the world's top listing venue in terms of IPO funds raised in seven of the past 11 years.

The Group also operates four clearing houses in Hong Kong: Hong Kong Securities Clearing Company Limited (HKSCC), HKFE Clearing Corporation Limited (HKCC), the SEHK Options Clearing House Limited (SEOCH) and OTC Clearing Hong Kong Limited (OTC Clear). HKSCC, HKCC and SEOCH provide integrated clearing, settlement, depository and nominee activities to their participants, while OTC Clear provides OTC interest rate derivatives and non-deliverable forwards clearing and settlement services to its members. HKEX provides market data through its data dissemination entity, HKEX Information Services Limited

The Hong Kong Government is the single largest shareholder in HKEX, and has the right to appoint six of the thirteen directors to the board.

History

Securities market
Reports of securities trading in Hong Kong date back to the mid-19th century. However, the first formal market, the Association of Stockbrokers in Hong Kong, was not established until 1891.  The Association was renamed the Hong Kong Stock Exchange in 1914.

A second exchange, the Hong Kong Stockbrokers' Association was incorporated in 1921.  The two exchanges merged to form the Hong Kong Stock Exchange in 1947 and re-establish the stock market after the Second World War.
Rapid growth of the Hong Kong economy led to the establishment of three other exchanges - the Far East Exchange in 1969; the Kam Ngan Stock Exchange in 1971; and the Kowloon Stock Exchange in 1972.

Pressure to strengthen market regulation and to unify the four exchanges led to the incorporation of SEHK, the Stock Exchange of Hong Kong Limited in 1980.  The four exchanges ceased business on 27 March 1986 and the new exchange commenced trading through a computer-assisted system on 2 April 1986.  Prior to the completion of the merger with HKFE in March 2000, the unified stock exchange had 570 participant organisations.

Hong Kong Securities Clearing Company Limited was incorporated in 1989. It created CCASS, the central clearing and settlement system, which started operating in 1992 and became the central counterparty for all CCASS participants. The clearing operation is based on the immobilisation of share certificates in a central depository. Share settlement is on a continuous net settlement basis by electronic book entry to participants' stock accounts in CCASS. Transactions between CCASS participants are settled on T+2, the second trading day following the transaction.
The company also offers nominee service.

Penny stocks fiasco
In April 2002, HKEX launched a study to consider the delisting of "penny stocks" to improve market efficiency. Its 25 July 2002 proposal to cancel listings of companies trading below HK$0.50 for 30 straight days hit penny stocks hard. Seventeen companies' shares lost more than 30 per cent of their value, and about HK$6 billion in market capitalisation was wiped off 105 listed companies. Activist David Webb said that HKEX's desire to delist stemmed from these companies generating very little revenue for the exchange but taking up a disproportionate amount of staff resources. Webb decried the conflict of interest between its role as operator and regulator, and called on the regulatory role to be passed to the SFC.

On 10 September 2002, a government report was released which found HKEX Chief Executive Kwong Ki-chi guilty of administrative mistakes and said he "should be held responsible on behalf of the HKEX for any major policy shortcomings in the preparation and release of the consultation paper".

Derivatives market
Established in 1976, the Hong Kong Commodity Exchange (the predecessor of Hong Kong Futures Exchange Limited) is a derivatives leader in the Asia-Pacific region.  The main products traded on the commodity exchange were cotton futures, sugar futures, soybean futures and gold futures.  The Hong Kong Commodity Exchange was renamed the Hong Kong Futures Exchange (HKFE) on 7 May 1985.

HKFE launched on 6 May 1986 its flagship product, the HSI Futures, which is still its most popular futures product in HKEX’s derivatives markets today.  HKFE provides efficient and diversified markets for trading futures and options contracts by its more than 160 participant organisations, including many that are affiliated to international financial institutions.  The derivatives market under HKEX trades a broad range of products, including equity index, stock and interest rate.

HKEX and its subsidiary companies, HKFE Clearing Corporation Limited and SEHK Options Clearing House Limited, operate rigorous risk management system which enables participants and their clients to meet their investment and hedging needs in a liquid and well-regulated market place.

OTC Clearing Hong Kong Limited (OTC Clear) was incorporated as a subsidiary of HKEX in May 2012 for the purpose of acting as the clearing house for OTC derivatives in Hong Kong. Subsequently, HKEX, under the founding member programme, invited 12 financial institutions as founding members of OTC Clear, who in total hold 25 per cent of issued share capital in OTC Clear (in the form of non-voting ordinary shares) whilst HKEX holds the remaining 75 per cent. HKEX continues to hold 100 per cent of the voting ordinary shares of OTC Clear.

OTC Clear started offering OTC derivatives clearing services in November 2013. OTC Clear created OCASS, the OTC Clearing and Settlement System, for OTC Derivatives clearing and became the central counterparty for all clearing members. OTC Clear is currently providing clearing and settlement services interest rate swaps and non-deliverable forward products.

Base metals market
In June 2012, HKEX announced its cash offer to acquire the London Metal Exchange (LME), the world's premier metal exchange since its founding in 1877, for GBP1.388 billion. The acquisition was completed in December 2012.

HKEX is also the majority owner of the Qianhai Mercantile Exchange, a commodities trading platform in Mainland China which has yet to officially begin operations. The Qianhai Authority has given the green light to HKEX to set up the commodities platform in the special economic zone, but official crackdowns on spot trading platforms in Mainland China have caused a delay.

Merger speculation
After the New York Stock Exchange announced in November 2006 that it would open an office in Beijing to work with the Shanghai Stock Exchange, Hong Kong Exchanges and Clearing chairman Ronald Arculli dampened speculation, saying it has no immediate plans to acquire or merge with other exchanges, but would focus on "strengthening our competitiveness and reviewing our listing fees".

In September 2019 Hong Kong Exchanges and Clearing  made a proposal to the London Stock Exchange to merge the two companies in a cash and share deal worth £29.6 billion, or £31.6 billion ($39 billion) including debt. If the deal had gone through, the combined exchange would have been the world's third largest after the New York Stock Exchange and NASDAQ in terms of the total value of the companies on the exchanges.

Infrastructure
Computers were integrated on 2 April 1986, which has helped modernise the system.  In 1993 the exchange launched the "Automatic Order Matching and Execution System" (AMS) that was replaced by the third generation system (AMS/3) in October 2000.  Systems as such were added to meet the increased popularity of online stock trading.

Trading hours

HKEX's morning session runs from 09:00 am to 12:00 pm; the extended morning session is from 12:00 pm until 1:00 pm and the afternoon session is from 1:00 pm to 4:00 pm.

HKEX implemented a Closing Auction Session (CAS) in two phases on 25 July 2016 and 24 July 2017. The securities eligible for the CAS include all constituents of the Hang Seng Composite LargeCap, MidCap and SmallCap indices, H shares which have corresponding A shares listed on a mainland exchange and all exchange traded funds. It also includes some regulated short-selling orders.

A Volatility Control Mechanism (VCM), which functions similarly to circuit breakers on US exchanges, was implemented in two phases on 22 August 2016 and 16 January 2017.

Products
Major securities products include equity securities, depositary receipts, debt securities, unit trusts/mutual funds (i.e. ETFs and REITs) and structured products. Derivative products include index and stock futures and options, interest rate and fixed income products and gold futures.

Government share purchase
In September 2007, the government revealed that it had increased its stake in HKEX from 4.41 percent to 5.88 percent. According to market sources, the Government spent HK$2.44 billion to buy 15.72 million shares in the company. The stake would be held by the Exchange Fund as a "strategic asset".

The move has drawn widespread criticism in Hong Kong and abroad: governance advocate and board member David Webb said that the government was the second-largest single investor in the Hong Kong market after Beijing, with a portfolio of local equities estimated to be worth about HK$150 billion. He said the purchase violated the government's stated principle of "big market, small government", adding that it increased uncertainty and sends a very negative signal to the market as a whole; the Civic Party criticised the Government for damaging public confidence in the capital market, and interfering with the stock exchange's independence; a Wall Street Journal editorial said that the Hong Kong Government is further interfering in the market to "cozy up to China's tightly controlled domestic exchanges". Financial commentator Jake van der Kamp noted the Financial Secretary's conundrum: The government is faced with a conflict of interest, as its desire for an efficient marketplace is contrary to its desire as a shareholder, who would prefer to maximise returns.

The government said that it wanted to play a positive role in the stock exchange's development as a shareholder.  Analysts expect the government will continue to increase its stake, as HKEX is being prepared "for future integration and alliance with mainland exchanges". Another analyst was concerned about the independence of "independent chairman" Ronald Arculli, who also sits on the Executive Council.

Regulation to extend directors' trading blackout
Between 11 January 2008 and 7 April 2008, HKEX launched a consultation paper proposing changes to the Listing Rules "to address 18 substantive policy issues pertaining to corporate governance and initial listing criteria". On 28 November 2008, new rules were announced which included, inter alia, limitation of directors' trading in their companies' shares between the end of each semester until after publication of its results. The Listing Rule amendments were due to become effective on 1 January 2009. The previous blackout period is within one month of publication, and was considered by HKEx to "fail to ensure that insiders do not abuse the market while in possession of unpublished price-sensitive information".

In mid-December, legislators representing the functional constituencies, led by Abraham Razack, Chim Pui Chung and David Li, demanded that regulators postponed the execution of a prolonged blackout proposal. Razack said HKEx did not consult widely enough and the process was a "black- box operation" that did not reflect industry opinion; David Webb said that the campaign was due to some well-connected tycoons and company directors' rearguard action to derail the rule change. On 30 December 2008, the Listing Committee said it would not withdraw the new rule because it would "have a long-term benefit on the market. However it postponed the rules' introduction by three months."

Senior leadership

Chairmen

Chief Executives

CEO's alleged involvement in "princeling" hirings
In 2015, the Wall Street Journal reported that the CEO of the exchange at the time, Charles Li, while he was chairman of JP Morgan China from 2003 to 2009, recommended hiring the children and associates of Chinese officials, clients and potential future clients. At the time, JP Morgan was investigated by the US Securities and Exchange Commission and the US Department of Justice into possible violation of anti-bribery laws by improperly hiring relatives of Chinese officials, known as "princelings", to win business.

See also
 Hang Seng Index
 Economy of Hong Kong
 List of Chinese companies
 Companies listed on the Hong Kong Stock Exchange
 List of East Asian stock exchanges
 List of stock exchanges
 :Category:Companies of Hong Kong

References

External links
 
 Hong Kong Exchanges and Clearing Limited 

Financial services companies established in 2000
Companies listed on the Hong Kong Stock Exchange
Finance in Hong Kong
2000 establishments in Hong Kong
Companies in the Hang Seng Index
Central securities depositories
Securities clearing and depository institutions
Futures exchanges
Stock exchanges in Hong Kong